Thomas Stelzer may refer to:
 Thomas Stelzer (diplomat), Austrian diplomat
 Thomas Stelzer (politician), governor of Upper Austria